The Trust is a 2016 American crime drama / comic thriller film directed by Alex and Ben Brewer, written by Ben Brewer and Adam Hirsch, and starring Nicolas Cage, Elijah Wood, Sky Ferreira, Jerry Lewis, Kevin Weisman and Steven Williams. The film was released on DirecTV on April 14, 2016, before being released on video on demand and in theaters on May 13, 2016, by Saban Films. Although Max Rose was released after The Trust, this film marks the last role that Jerry Lewis filmed before his death in 2017.

Plot
Young police Sergeant David Waters and his older boss and friend Lieutenant Jim Stone both work in the Evidence Management unit of the Las Vegas Metropolitan Police Department. Disillusioned and bored with their jobs, they also find it hard to make ends meet financially. While looking through case files, Jim comes across a mysterious case: a low level drug dealer who was bailed out of jail—paid for with $200,000 in cash—indicating that this dealer has access to large amounts of money.

Using his vacation days, Jim conducts unapproved undercover surveillance at the hotel where the drug dealer works. He discovers that all of the merchandise that the dealer's gang moves is taken to one building, and never moved out. David acquires blueprints from the county planning office and discovers that the gang has built a large safe in the back of an industrial freezer in the building. Realizing it is unguarded, Jim and David decide to break into the safe and steal the contents. They map out the exact location of the safe and acquire a floor-standing drill press and a diamond-tipped drill from Germany to drill into the safe door. They also buy black market firearms to use instead of their service pistols, paying for everything with illegally acquired cash from a corrupt colleague. The complicated plan requires them to drill into the safe door from the residential apartment above the freezer, to allow them to attack the safe without triggering "failsafe" door locks. Much of the heist is planned in meticulous detail, but the plan for dealing with whoever is in the targeted apartment is left unclear.

On the day of the theft, the two break into the apartment above the freezer, but they do not handle the two occupants, a man and a woman, very well.  They restrain and muffle the two, but Jim ends up shooting and killing the man after a spitting incident goes bad. They use up two regular drill bits going through the concrete that divides the two spaces. They then use the diamond-tipped drill to go into the safe door, but the drill press stops working when a drive belt breaks. Having no spare belts, the two build an improvised explosive to finish the hole.  Once the hole is completed, Jim watches the safe's tumblers using a long flexible cystoscope, while David manipulates the safe's dial.  As each number is identified, David writes it on the safe door. When the door is opened, the two discover that the high-tech vault is filled with extraordinary high-value gems and cash. Jim is elated, but David becomes concerned that stealing so many valuables from the gang will get them tracked down and killed. They decide to return to the apartment to clean up, in preparation to leave, and David locks the safe behind him as the two go back upstairs.

In the apartment, David, becomes empathetic for the surviving female hostage. She asks David to call her husband, so she can make sure that her 3-year-old son is taken care of—David agrees and the woman has a very brief conversation with whoever answers the phone.  They break down the drillbit and discuss what is left to be done before they leave.  When Jim and David return to the safe, Jim discovers that David not only re-locked the safe door, but also erased the combination numbers.  Enraged, Jim threatens David at gunpoint, forcing him to open the safe. The valuables are loaded into bags and Jim begins loading bags into their van. But when David goes to kill the woman, he gets cold feet and shoots Jim instead. After a brief shootout, Jim is finally killed.

David returns all the valuables back into the safe and loads the woman hostage into the van, promising her that he will release her when they get far enough away from the city.  As they are driving on a deserted stretch of road, the van is surrounded by other vehicles, including a contractor's truck marked with a company's phone number—the same phone number that the woman had David call earlier.  David attempts to identify himself as a police officer, but he is shot dead, and the movie closes with physical evidence from the car and heist being catalogued and stored in the Evidence Management building where David and Jim used to work.

Cast
 Nicolas Cage as Stone
 Elijah Wood as Waters
 Sky Ferreira as Woman
 Jerry Lewis as Stone's Father
 Ethan Suplee as Detective
 Kenna James as Captain Harris
 Kevin Weisman as Roy
 Steven Williams as Cliff

Production
On May 14, 2014, Nicolas Cage and Jack Huston joined the prospective cast, the latter for the co-leading role eventually assigned to  Elijah Wood. On November 6, 2014, Saban Films acquired distribution rights to the film. On January 30, 2015, Elijah Wood joined the cast. On February 9, 2015, singer Sky Ferreira joined the cast. On February 18, 2015, Jerry Lewis joined the cast. Principal photography began on January 26, 2015. Filming took place entirely in Las Vegas.

Release
The film premiered at South by Southwest on March 13, 2016. The film was released on DirecTV on April 14, 2016, before being released on video on demand and in theaters on May 13, 2016, by Saban Films.

Home media
The film was released on DVD and Blu-ray on August 2, 2016.

Reception
The Trust received mixed reviews from critics. On Rotten Tomatoes, the film has an approval rating of 63%, based on 46 reviews, with an average rating of 5.47/10. The critical consensus states: "The Trust may not be an all-time heist classic, but its solidly workmanlike plot -- and the chemistry between Nicolas Cage and Elijah Wood -- should satisfy genre enthusiasts." On Metacritic, the film has a score of 58 out of 100, based on 12 critics, indicating "mixed or average reviews".

References

External links
 

2016 films
2016 black comedy films
2016 crime drama films
2016 crime thriller films
2010s comedy thriller films
2010s crime comedy-drama films
2010s English-language films
2010s heist films
American black comedy films
American comedy thriller films
American crime comedy-drama films
American crime thriller films
American heist films
Fictional portrayals of the Las Vegas Metropolitan Police Department
Films set in the Las Vegas Valley
Films shot in the Las Vegas Valley
Saban Films films
2010s American films